Mary Olive Crane (born 28 November 1957) is a Canadian politician and social worker from Douglas Station, Prince Edward Island. She was the leader of the Progressive Conservative Party of Prince Edward Island from 2007 to 2010 on an interim basis and 2010 to 2013 on a permanent basis. She was also leader of the Official Opposition in the Legislative Assembly of Prince Edward Island from 2007 to 2010 and 2010 to 2013.

A native of Morell, Prince Edward Island, Crane is a graduate of Dalhousie University. She is a career civil servant, working as a social worker for the provincial government since 1979. She has worked in a variety of departments from Health & Social Services, Office of the Attorney General to Agriculture, Fisheries and Aquaculture. She was elected to the Legislative Assembly of Prince Edward Island on March 20, 2006 in the by-election for District #2, Morell-Fortune Bay, and re-elected to the Legislature on May 28, 2007 representing District # 7, Morell-Mermaid.  Following the 2007 election, she was appointed the Opposition Critic for Health, Education, the Status of Women, and Communities, Cultural Affairs and Labour.

On September 4, 2007 she was appointed the interim leader of the Progressive Conservative Party of Prince Edward Island, She was the fifth woman to serve as leader/interim leader of a PEI political party (after Leone Bagnall, Pat Mella, Catherine Callbeck and Sharon Labchuk).

On May 26, 2010, Olive Crane resigned as interim leader of the Progressive Conservative Party of Prince Edward Island and announced her intentions to seek the permanent leadership. On October 2, 2010, she won the leadership of the PEI Progressive Conservative Party on the second ballot, defeating her main opponent Jamie Ballem. Crane led the party in the 2011 election, receiving 40 per cent of the vote and winning five seats. She was also re-elected in her Morell-Mermaid riding.

On December 5, 2012, Crane announced her resignation as leader of the party effective January 31, 2013.

On October 4, 2013 (over eight months after her resignation as PC party leader) Olive Crane was kicked out of the PEI PC Caucus by interim leader, Steven Myers. In an impromptu press conference, Myer's stated "Unfortunately promises were made that were broken yesterday. Olive contradicted a promise that she made to our caucus when she went in the media this morning… if you take it in terms of a hockey coach, you need to know that everybody that's going on the ice is doing the same job." Myer's was referring to an interview Crane made with the Guardian on Thursday, October 3, 2013 on the subject of former Opposition Leader Hal Perry crossing the aisle to the Liberal Party where she believes Perry's defection was the result of a group of party insiders who tried to oust her as leader last year, resulting in a year of internal struggles that have aired publicly and embarrassingly for the party. Myers says Crane's interview with The Guardian Thursday broke a promise that was made during a caucus meeting earlier in the day that no MLAs would speak with media following a brief news conference held to offer reaction to Perry's departure. "We had agreed as a caucus about how we would deal with Hal's defection," Myers said. "To have somebody go off on their own and do a private interview… we can’t have stuff like that as a party that is trying to rebuild." Myers said this has been an ongoing concern with Crane and felt this was the last straw. Following the announcement, Crane sat as an Independent MLA.

Crane did not reoffer as a candidate in the 2015 election. In July 2015, Crane was hired by the Liberal government as a labour market specialist in the Department of Workforce and Advanced Learning.

She is the sister of Dody Crane, a former leader of the Prince Edward Island New Democratic Party.

Election results

References

External links
 Olive Crane profile at Government of PEI (copy archived September 2007)

People from Kings County, Prince Edward Island
Living people
Dalhousie University alumni
Progressive Conservative Party of Prince Edward Island MLAs
Women MLAs in Prince Edward Island
Female Canadian political party leaders
Progressive Conservative Party of Prince Edward Island leaders
21st-century Canadian politicians
21st-century Canadian women politicians
1957 births